Nkangala may refer to:

Nkangala District Municipality
Nkangala dialect of Mbunda